Aale Corona is a 2021 Sri Lankan family drama film directed by Sanjaya Nirmal and produced by U. A. Palliyaguru for Cloud Films. It stars Jehan Appuhamy and Dishni Rajapaksa in the lead roles along with Wasantha Vittachchi, Deepani Silva, Buddhika Jayaratne in supportive roles. The film has shot in realistic style. FILL-T R and Adisha Beats composed rap music and Seneth Dayantha involved with rock songs in the film. The film was completed in just 17 days during the long COVID-19 epidemic season.

The film depicts a couple living alone during the COVID-19 period and their 42-day period. It also emphasis on experiences that led to the battle of life in the face of social and economic crisis. About 90% of the film's frames are shot in the same room.

The film has received negative reviews from critics.

Cast
 Jehan Appuhamy as Sujan
 Dishni Rajapaksa as Tekla
 Wasantha Vittachchi as Police officer
 Deepani Silva as Servant
 Buddhika Jayaratne

References

External links
 Aale Corona on Sinhala Cinema Database
 

2021 films
2020s Sinhala-language films
2021 drama films
Sri Lankan drama films